Dichomeris trilobella is a moth in the family Gelechiidae. It was described by Kyu-Tek Park and Ronald W. Hodges in 1995. It is found in Taiwan.

The length of the forewings is about 9.5–10 mm. The forewings are greyish brown with scattered dark brown scales and a distinct dark brown spot at the base. The costal blotch is dark brown. The hindwings are dark grey.

References

Moths described in 1995
trilobella